Almont-les-Junies is a commune in the Aveyron department in the Occitanie region of southern France.

The inhabitants of the commune are known as Junhalmontois or Junhalmontoises

Geography
Almont-les-Junies is located some 20 km east of Figeac and 40 km north-east of Rodez. The commune can be accessed by road D508 which runs east from Flagnac through the commune and changes to road D606 before exiting east and forming the south-eastern border as it runs south-east to Noailhac.  The D183 road also runs through the south of the commune running west to east. The village can be reached by a number of country roads which cover most of the commune. The most direct perhaps is the Graville-et-Courbies road which runs south from the D508.

The commune contains both large areas of farmland as well as mountain slopes with forests.

There are many streams in the commune - the southern border is marked by the Rousseau de Limou which flows into the Lot river just west of the commune. The Lot river itself also forms the northern border of the commune and all of the many streams flow into this river.

There are a number of hamlets and villages in the commune. These are:
Aumont
Ginouilhac
La Mole Haute
La Plane
Laval
Le Fau
Les Clementies
L'Hom
Mazac
Sainte Catherine

Neighbouring communes and villages

History
On 1 April 1993, the town of Almon-les-Junies was renamed Almont-les-Junies with a "t" to be closer to the Latin root of Almontis. Road signs in the area remained unchanged for some years.

Administration

List of Successive Mayors of Almont-les-Junies

Population

See also 
 Communes of the Aveyron department

References

External links
Almont-les-Junies on the old IGN website 
Almont-les-Junies on Géoportail, National Geographic Institute (IGN) website 
Aumont on the 1750 Cassini Map

Communes of Aveyron